Maulana Hazrat Khalifa Mian Ghulam Muhammad Din Puri (1835 - 24 March 1936) was an Islamic scholar also known as the founder of Dinpur. He was originally from Jhang and belonged to the Rind Baloch family. He also played an active role in the Silk handkerchief movement.

Ghulam Muhammad was born in 1835 in the Mouza Alam Khan of eastern Jhang District.

There was an old man named Hafiz Muhammad Siddique of Mouza Bharchondi Sharif in Sindh. Maulana Ghulam Muhammad was also impressed by them, and from time to time visited Choundi and lived in their service. Hafiz Mohammad Siddique tested and trained Maulana Ghulam Mohammad's inner abilities.

He died on 24 March 1936. Maulana Ghulam Muhammad Ghotvi, Vice Chancellor of Bahawalpur University led the funeral prayers. He is buried in Dinpur Cemetery.

See also
 Hafiz Muhammad Siddique

References 

People from Rahim Yar Khan District
People from Jhang District
1835 births
1936 deaths
Deobandis
Pakistani centenarians
Men centenarians